Republic of Korea Naval Academy is a four-year military academy located in Jinhae, South Korea. Established in 1946, it is the oldest of the 3 service academies of Korea. The school educates naval midshipmen for commissioning primarily into the Republic of Korea Navy and the Republic of Korea Marine Corps, and is administered by a superintendent with the rank of vice admiral.

Location
The ROKNA is located in Jinhae, a district of Changwon, South Korea. Jinhae is almost completely surrounded by mountains covered with pine trees. This city is famous for its annual cherry blossom festival every spring. The cherry blossom festival in Jinhae is called Gunhangje (Naval Port Festival). It was started since 1963, and it is an artistic and cultural event. It also has global events with the promotion of arts and flowers.

The reason why the Naval Academy is located in Jinhae is that Jinhae is a strategically important location. Before ROKNA was founded, the Japanese army used Jinhae as a military base. It's an ideal spot. There are many islands in the sea in front of the Naval Academy. It makes waves weaker, so the port is relatively safe. Also it makes it hard to access for the enemy.

Campus

Choongmoo-Gwan

The first thing is Choongmoo-Gwan. It's the headquarters of the Naval Academy. It was built in January 2002. A lot of officers work in here and they make everything about the programs that are related to the Naval Academy. The superintendent works in this building, too. It's situated in the center of the Naval Academy.

Tonghae-Gwan

Tonghae Center is the latest building in the ROKNA. It consists of many kinds of classrooms which have sophisticated facilities. A school library and DVD center is very useful for midshipmen.

Sebyung-Gwan

Sebyung-Gwan is a dormitory for midshipmen. All midshipmen stay in here. The name of the building derives from the building used by Admiral Yi. This building contains modern technology. This building can be divided into two parts: east and west. One company lives in each sector. On the sixth floor is Myeong-ryang Hall which is a dining place.

Admissions
The number of admitted applicants can be changed, but admitted applicants include 10% females. 90% of total applicants must be men and 10% of total applicants must be women.
The admission rate of the Naval Academy is from 2% to 5%, depending on the year.
 
The period of education is four years.
 
Eligibility Requirements
 Must be Republic of Korea citizens.
 Must have good moral character.
 Must be unmarried.
 Must have graduated high school or be scheduled to graduate high school. Otherwise, qualified graduation of high school by The Ministry of Education and Human Resources Development.
 Must not have been dismissed from the government or the military, or sentenced to any penalty other than confinement.

Curriculum
Midshipmen can choose from nine majors: naval architecture, weapons systems, electrical engineering, management science, oceanography, computer science, military strategy, international relations, and foreign language.

The beginning of midshipmen's curriculum is semi-entrance training. It includes hard level military training and learning a soldier's spirit. During this period, just normal citizens and high school students become soldiers. After five weeks long training, new freshmen enter the Naval Academy officially. At this time, they declare that they will dedicate their life to keep the peace and fight for justice. As new freshmen come in, seniors graduate. The duty changing ceremony and honor company appointment ceremony takes place with it. Because of the combination inaugural ceremony, only the graduation ceremony takes place in the Naval Academy. After this ceremony, the first semester begins. About three weeks after beginning the semester, the bottom transfer ceremony takes place. It has five parts: martial arts, dancing, singing band, singing together, and symbols. From this time, freshmen's title is changed to "bottom," and they learn about "bottom life."

First semester midterm exam: This is the first examination of the year. Midshipmen take an exam without any supervisor.

First semester's final exam: This is the last exam of the first semester.

Military practice: After the end of the first semester, midshipmen get a military practice and freshmen, sophomores, juniors, and seniors each get different practice.

Combat swimming: Midshipmen practice swimming for a week and swim around the 'Seo-do' island, 5 km long.

The parade of Armed Forces Day: This is one of the most important events to the Korean Armed Forces. The midshipmen in the ROKNA take part in this day and have a parade. For this annual event, the midshipmen exercise from one week to two weeks. Also for that day, all cadets in Korea take part in the parade.

Practice and Training
Plebe Training (Boot Camp)

The training is for plebes and its purpose is becoming a soldier from a civilian student.  The training generally starts in the middle of January and ends after five weeks in the middle of February. It consists of five weeks called: Obedience, Patience, Perseverance, Victory, and Honor. Plebes discipline their bodies and spirits needed to be midshipmen and learn basic things about the Navy through this training.

Practice Amphibious Operation (Freshman)

The purpose of this practice is understanding the Marine Corps and disciplining themselves for stronger bodies and spirit during four weeks in Pohang in July. Freshmen experience Marine’s amphibious operation, ranger training and airborne training.

Practice Maritime and Adapting Ship (Sophomore)

The purpose of this practice is understanding basic things about ships and the Navy and adapting to a maritime environment. Sophomores visit real ships and Naval units, train with SSU or UDT, and learn scuba diving to get an ‘open water grade’ license

Coast Navigate Training (Junior)

The purpose of this practice is learning how to administrate a ship and understanding Coalition Operations. Juniors board on Navy ships (LST, PCC, MLS) to navigate the Korean coast and visit the main military commanders near the main ports during four weeks in July.

Cruise Training (Senior)

The purpose of this practice is growing a perspective of national policies and international perception. They also learn abilities for becoming ensigns. In this term, midshipmen visit many countries in the world. And then, they enhance their national prestige and diplomacy (such as parade, tae-kwon-do performance, and having a reception on the ship) while they visit there. Cruise Training commonly takes three to five months.

Annual Events

Induction Ceremony

After taking special 5-week training, plebes can become regular midshipmen. The Induction Ceremony in the ROK Naval Academy is held usually at the end of February. Many of the plebes' families and friends come to celebrate the plebes. And all midshipmen participate in this ceremony with special uniforms.

Graduation Ceremony

After four tough years, midshipmen graduate from school and they are born as new ensigns. The graduation ceremony is usually held in February one week after the induction ceremony. At the graduation ceremony, many celebrities come and the families of midshipmen are invited. It is one of the biggest annual events in the ROKNA.

Okpo Festival

Okpo Festival is ROK Naval Academy's annual festival. It usually starts in May. All midshipmen have their own cultural clubs and in Okpo Festival, midshipmen show their annual projects. There are many programs in Okpo Festival. It consists of the ocean-scientific lecture, the midshipmen night, and the Okpo's night. During the Okpo Festival period, this festival and the academy are open to any civilians.

See also
List of national universities in South Korea
List of universities and colleges in South Korea
Education in Korea

References

External links

Official website (Korean) / English
Jinhae Gunhangje Festival
Korea Naval Academy Museum

Buildings and structures in Changwon
Naval academies
Military academies of South Korea
Universities and colleges in South Gyeongsang Province
Educational institutions established in 1946
Republic of Korea Navy
1946 establishments in Korea